= Ali Mansour Kayali =

Syrian architect and Islamic researcher

- Born: 31 March 1953 (age 73); Aleppo, Syria
- Occupations: Architect, Islamic researcher

Ali Mansour Kayali is a Syrian architect and Islamic researcher known for his Quranic interpretations and lectures on religious and scientific subjects. His approach to Quranic interpretation has been examined in academic studies, particularly in relation to his use of linguistic analysis and contextual interpretation.

== Religious work ==
Kayali has delivered lectures and appeared in television programmes discussing his interpretations of the Quran and the relationship between religious texts and scientific concepts. His work has addressed subjects including the interpretation of Quranic terminology and the relationship between the Quran and the natural sciences.

A 2021 study by Narges Abdul Reda Hussein and Read Hashem Abboud examined Kayali's use of context in interpreting Quranic texts, focusing on his position on synonymy in the Quran.

== Reception and criticism ==
Kayali's interpretations have been the subject of academic criticism. A 2021 study published in the IUG Journal of Islamic Studies examined his arguments concerning the punishment of the grave and his approach to the authority of the Sunnah.

In 2021, Amru Abdulaziz Ibrahim Hammad, Mustafa Abdullah and Thabet Ahmad Abdullah Abu Alhaj published a study examining Kayali's interpretations of the Quran as a case study of contemporary approaches to interpreting the Quran through the Quran.

In 2023, Usama Derşevi published a critical study of Kayali's linguistic interpretation of Quranic verses in BALAGH: Journal of Islamic and Humanities Studies. The study assessed his methodology against established approaches to Quranic interpretation and criticized aspects of his use of Arabic linguistic rules.

A further critical study published in 2024 in the Islamic Sciences Journal examined his interpretation of Quranic teachings on polygamy.

In 2019, the Omani newspaper Al-Shabiba reported on public disagreement surrounding a proposed lecture by Kayali in Oman, including calls to cancel the event and responses advocating public debate rather than cancellation.
